Lagoa do Itaenga (also written Lagoa de Itaenga) is a municipality located in the state of Pernambuco, Brazil. Located 78 km from Recife, capital of the state of Pernambuco. As of 2020, it has an estimated population of 21,460 (IBGE 2020).

Geography
 State - Pernambuco
 Region - Zona da mata Pernambucana
 Boundaries - Carpina and Lagoa do Carro (N); Glória do Goitá (S); Paudalho (E); Feira Nova and Limoeiro (W)
 Area - 57.9 km2
 Elevation - 183 m
 Hydrography - Capibaribe River
 Vegetation - Subcaducifólia and Caducifólia forests
 Climate - Hot tropical and humid
 Annual average temperature - 24.6 c
 Distance to Recife - 78 km

Economy
The main economic activities in Lagoa de Itaenga are largely dominated by the food & beverage industry (77%) and agribusiness, especially sugarcane and cattle.

Economic indicators

Economy by Sector

2006

Health indicators

References

Municipalities in Pernambuco